Belsky (masculine), Belskaya (feminine), or Belskoye (neuter) may refer to:

 Belsky (surname), a Russian-originated last name
Belsky (cartoonist), British cartoonist and illustrator
 Belsky District, name of several districts in Russia
 Belsky (rural locality) (Belskaya, Belskoye), name of several rural localities in Russia
 8786 Belskaya, a main-belt asteroid